{{DISPLAYTITLE:Beta1-adrenergic agonist}}
Beta1-adrenergic agonists, also known as Beta1-adrenergic receptor agonists, are a class of drugs that bind selectively to the beta-1 adrenergic receptor. As a result, they act more selectively upon the heart. Beta-adrenoceptors typically bind to norepinephrine release by sympathetic adrenergic nerves and to circulating epinephrine. The effect of B-adrenoceptors is cardiac stimulation, such as increased heart rate, heart contractility, heart conduction velocity and heart relaxation.

Examples 
Examples include:

 denopamine  β1 agonist
 dobutamine         β1>β2 agonist
 xamoterol            β1 partial agonist
 epinephrine
 Epinephrine is a non-selective beta agonist, this means it also stimulates the beta 2 adrenergic receptor. Therefore, epinephrine is a Beta2-adrenergic agonist.
 Isoprenaline

References 

Beta-adrenergic agonists